Ton Fontani (15 October 1930 – 22 June 2005) was a Dutch rower. He competed in the men's coxed four event at the 1952 Summer Olympics.

References

1930 births
2005 deaths
Dutch male rowers
Olympic rowers of the Netherlands
Rowers at the 1952 Summer Olympics
Rowers from Amsterdam